An American Tragedy (1931) is a pre-Code drama film directed by Josef von Sternberg. It was produced and distributed by Paramount Pictures. The film is based on Theodore Dreiser's 1925 novel An American Tragedy and the 1926 play adaptation. These were based on the historic 1906 murder of Grace Brown by Chester Gillette at Big Moose Lake in upstate New York.

The novel would again be adapted in the 1951 Paramount release A Place in the Sun.

Cast

Phillips Holmes as Clyde Griffiths
Sylvia Sidney as Roberta Alden
Frances Dee as Sondra Finchley
Irving Pichel as District Attorney Orville Mason
Frederick Burton as Samuel Griffiths
Claire McDowell as Mrs. Samuel Griffiths
Wallace Middleton as Gilbert Griffiths
Emmett Corrigan as Belknap
Charles B. Middleton as Jephson
Lucille La Verne as Mrs. Asa Griffiths
Albert Hart as Titus Alden
Fanny Midgley as Mrs. Alden
Arnold Korff as Judge Oberwaltzer
Russell Powell as Coroner Fred Heit
William Bailey as Reporter in Courtroom (uncredited)
Ed Brady as Train Brakeman (uncredited) 
Richard Cramer as Deputy Sheriff Kraut (uncredited)
Claire Dodd as Gaile Warren (uncredited)
George Irving as Mr. Finchley (uncredited)
Arline Judge as Bella Griffiths (uncredited)
Guy Oliver as Simeon Dinsmore (uncredited)
Evelyn Peirce as Bertine Cranston (uncredited)
Harry Stubbs as Court Clerk (uncredited)
Nella Walker as Hotel Guest (uncredited)

Background
Paramount Pictures purchased the film rights for Theodore Dreiser's 1925 novel An American Tragedy for $150,000. The widely acclaimed Russian director Sergei Eisenstein was hired to film an adaptation, with Dreiser's enthusiastic support. When Eisenstein was unable to procure studio approval for his "deterministic treatment," reflecting a Marxist perspective, he abandoned the project.

Paramount, with $500,000 already invested in the film, enlisted Josef von Sternberg to develop and direct his own film version of the novel. Dreiser was guaranteed by contract the right to review the script before production, and complained bitterly that the Sternberg-Hoffenstein interpretation of his novel's themes "outraged the book." When the film was completed, it was clear that the Sternberg screenplay had rejected any interpretation attributing protagonist Clyde Griffiths' antisocial behavior to a capitalist society and a strict religious upbringing, but rather located the problem in "the sexual hypocrisy of the [petty-bourgeois] social class." As Sternberg acknowledged in his memoirs: "I eliminated the sociological elements, which, in my opinion, were far from being responsible for the dramatic accident with which Dreiser concerned himself."

Dreiser sued Paramount Pictures to suppress the film but lost.

Reception

Film historian John Baxter wrote that An American Tragedy "met with mixed critical success. The New York Times called it 'emphatically stirring," the New York Daily News wrote it is 'intensely dramatic, moving, superbly acted', but many other papers, recalling Dreiser's protest, found the film less intense that the original novel, which is undoubtedly the case."

Marxist film critic Harry Alan Potamkin commented on "Sternberg's failure to understand Dreiser's larger thematic purpose: Before the story opens [Sternberg presents] repeated shots of water disturbed by a thrown object. And throughout the picture the captions are composed upon a background of rippling water. Sternberg saw the major idea of the matter [theme] in the drowning. How lamentable!" 

The film fared poorly at American theaters but was well-received among European moviegoers.

Theme

John Baxter identifies a thematic element in the struggle for human control over their destinies:

Critic Andrew Sarris singles out the following scene for its thematic significance:

References

Sources

Further reading
 Tibbetts, John C., and James M. Welsh, eds. The Encyclopedia of Novels Into Film (2nd ed. 2005) pp 15–17.

External links

Stills at pre-code.com

1931 films
1931 drama films
1930s English-language films
American black-and-white films
American courtroom films
American legal drama films
Films about social class
Films based on American novels
Films based on works by Theodore Dreiser
Films directed by Josef von Sternberg
Films set in New York (state)
Paramount Pictures films
Works based on An American Tragedy
1930s American films